Li Dawei (born 1963) is a Chinese writer born in 1963. He began writing poetry at age 17, and in 1985 graduated from Beijing Normal University with a degree in English. Two years later, he made his first visit to the United States, to attend Creative Writers Program sponsored by U.S. Information agency. Since 1987, he has been publishing theoretical works about art and literature and in 1997, he published his first novel, Dream Collector, which is centred with a young musician and a talking cat that is later converted into a cartoon star. He won Select Short Stories Monthly prize in 1996 and, in 1997, was short-listed for Lu Xun Literary Prize, China's arguably highest award for literature. He was given October Prize in 2000. He currently resides in Los Angeles. He is also a columnist for Caijing Magazine 

His novel Love, Revolution, And How Tomcat Haohao Goes To Hollywood was published by Knaus Publishing House, in Munich, in 2009. He currently divides his time between Beijing and New York.

Works

Books 
 念珠·击壤 (Lijiang Publishing House, 1987)
 集梦爱好者 (Dream Collector; Authors' Publishing House, 1997)
 China Wenxueshi Building oder: Heimatstraße West 2a, published in Das Leben ist jetzt；Suhrkamp Publishing House, Frankfurt 2003
 卡通猫的美国梦 (A Cartoon Cat's American Dream; Shandong Literary Publishing House, 2005)
 China Wenxueshi Building - via Jia Yuan Ovest 2, published in Cina - Undici scrittori della rivoluzione pop; Gruppo Editoriale il Saggiatore S.p.A., Milano 2006

Magazine articles 
 
  
 
  (2006) Magic Mountain Club, published in du - Magazine for culture No. 6/7, Swiss

References

1963 births
Living people
People's Republic of China poets
People's Republic of China translators
Writers from Beijing
Poets from Beijing
People's Republic of China essayists
20th-century essayists
21st-century essayists
20th-century Chinese translators
21st-century Chinese translators
Beijing Normal University alumni